Catch Me If You Can is a 2002 film directed by Steven Spielberg.

Catch Me If You Can may also refer to:

 Catch Me If You Can (book), by Frank Abagnale, the basis of the 2002 film

Film and stage 
 Catch Me If You Can (musical), a musical adaptation of the 2002 film
 Catch Me If You Can, a 1959 film directed by Don Weis
 Catch Me If You Can (play), a 1965 stage play by Willie Gilbert and Jack Weinstock
 Catch Me If You Can (1989 film), written and directed by Stephen Sommers

Music 
 Catch Me If You Can (Bashy album), the debut album of UK rapper Bashy
 Catch Me If You Can (soundtrack), the original soundtrack of the 2002 film
 Catch Me If You Can, the soundtrack of the 1989 film; see the Tangerine Dream discography
 Catch Me If You Can (EP), the debut extended play by Canadian singer Jess Moskaluke; or its title track
 "Catch Me If You Can" (Ana Johnsson song)
 "Catch Me If You Can" (M. Pokora song)
 "Catch Me If You Can," a song by Angela Via on the soundtrack album Pokémon: The First Movie
 "Catch Me If You Can" (Girls' Generation song), Girls' Generation's ninth Japanese single
 "Catch Me If You Can", a song by Gym Class Heroes on the album The Quilt
 "Catch Me If You Can", a song by Burnham
 "Catch Me If You Can", a song by Jacqueline Emerson
 "Catch Me If You Can", a song by Babymetal on the album Babymetal
 "Catch Me If You Can", a song from Sonic Riders and Sonic Riders: Zero Gravity
 "Catch Me If You Can", a song by Eden as a bonus track on the album End Credits
"Catch Me If You Can", a song written by Brendan Shine

Other uses 
 "Catch Me If You Can", a television episode in the list of Good Luck Charlie episodes
 "Catch Me If You Can" (The Vampire Diaries), a 2013 episode of the television series The Vampire Diaries
 "Catch Me If You Can" is a song from the second season of Soy Luna.

See also
 Catch Us If You Can (disambiguation)
 "Catch 'Em If You Can", a 2004 Simpsons episode
 Catch Me Who Can, a steam locomotive (1808)